Aleksandr Bakatin (1922 – 1977) was a diver from Russia. He competed in the 10m platform at the 1952 Summer Olympics and finished in seventh place.

References

1922 births
1977 deaths
Olympic divers of the Soviet Union
Divers at the 1952 Summer Olympics
Soviet male divers